Clay High School may refer to:

Clay High School (Green Cove Springs, Florida)
Clay High School (South Bend, Indiana)
Clay High School (Oregon, Ohio)
Clay High School (Portsmouth, Ohio)
Clay Center High School (Kansas), Clay Center, Kansas
Clay Center High School (Nebraska), Clay Center, Nebraska
Clay City High School (Illinois), Clay City, Illinois
Clay City Junior-Senior High School, Clay City, Indiana
Clay County High School (Ashland, Alabama), Ashland, Alabama
Clay County High School, Manchester, Kentucky
Clay County High School (Clay, West Virginia), Clay, West Virginia

See also
Clay-Battelle High School, Blacksville, West Virginia
Clay-Chalkville High School, Pinson, Alabama
Clay Central-Everly High School, Everly, Iowa
Henry Clay High School, Lexington, Kentucky
Lynchburg-Clay High School, Lynchburg, Ohio
North Clay Community High School, Louisville, Illinois
Randolph Clay High School, Cuthbert, Georgia